Baldwin is a town in St. Mary Parish, Louisiana, United States. The population was 2,436 at the 2010 census, down from 2,497 in 2000. It is part of the Morgan City Micropolitan Statistical Area.

The community was named for John Baldwin, the Ohio educator who founded what would later become Baldwin-Wallace University. His residence there, Darby House, remained in his family until 1937 and is now listed on the National Register of Historic Places.

The Louisiana physician and politician Alvan Lafargue practiced in Baldwin, his wife's hometown, prior to 1915.

Geography
Baldwin is located at  (29.836039, -91.548799).

Louisiana Highway 182, which passes throughout the entire town, travels 9 miles (14 km) northwest to Jeanerette and 5 miles (8 km) southeast to Franklin, the St. Mary Parish seat. Louisiana Highway 83, which intersects with LA-182, travels southwest from Baldwin to the unincorporated communities of Louisa, Glencoe, and Four Corners and heads back northwest to intersect with Louisiana Highway 14 in New Iberia.

Cypremort Point State Park is located 22 miles (35 km) southwest of Baldwin.

Demographics

2020 census

As of the 2020 United States census, there were 1,762 people, 804 households, and 447 families residing in the town.

2000 census
As of the census of 2000, there were 2,497 people, 777 households, and 607 families residing in the town. The racial makeup of the town was 32.16% White, 64.52% African American, 1.00% Native American, 0.84% Asian, 0.80% from other races, and 0.68% from two or more races. Hispanic or Latino of any race were 1.48% of the population.

There were 777 households, out of which 36.2% had children under the age of 18 living with them, 47.0% were married couples living together, 25.9% had a female householder with no husband present, and 21.8% were non-families. 18.5% of all households were made up of individuals, and 7.2% had someone living alone who was 65 years of age or older. The average household size was 2.99 and the average family size was 3.41.

In the town, the population was spread out, with 30.1% under the age of 18, 9.9% from 18 to 24, 28.6% from 25 to 44, 22.3% from 45 to 64, and 9.1% who were 65 years of age or older. The median age was 33 years. For every 100 females, there were 103.0 males. For every 100 females age 18 and over, there were 101.2 males.

The median income for a household in the town was $23,272, and the median income for a family was $25,606. Males had a median income of $28,938 versus $16,494 for females. The per capita income for the town was $10,118. About 28.1% of families and 31.8% of the population were below the poverty line, including 45.3% of those under age 18 and 22.8% of those age 65 or over.

Education
St. Mary Parish School Board operates public schools.

West St. Mary High School is near Baldwin.

References

Towns in Louisiana
Towns in St. Mary Parish, Louisiana